The four-man competition in bobsleigh at the 2022 Winter Olympics was held on 19 February (heats 1 and 2) and 20 February (heats 3 and 4), at the Xiaohaituo Bobsleigh and Luge Track in Yanqing District of Beijing. Francesco Friedrich, Thorsten Margis, Candy Bauer, and Alexander Schüller of Germany won the gold medal, and Friedrich thereby successfully defended his 2018 Olympic title. Germany-2 driven by Johannes Lochner won the silver medal, and Canada-1, driven by Justin Kripps, won the bronze.

There were two silver medals awarded in 2018. Nico Walther with Germany-2 retired from competitions, but Won Yun-jong with South Korea qualified for the Olympics. Friedrich is the 2021 World champion. Benjamin Maier and Austria is the silver medalist, and Lochner and Germany-2 are the bronze medalists. The 2021–22 Bobsleigh World Cup was completely dominated by Friedrich, who with his team won seven events out of eight races. The eighth event was won by Oskars Ķibermanis and Latvia. Friedrich won the World Cup, followed by Kripps with Canada and Rostislav Gaitiukevich with Russia.

Qualification

There was a quota of 28 sleds available for the men's two-man event. Qualification was based on the world rankings of the 2021/2022 season between 15 October 2020 and 16 January 2022. Pilots must have competed in six different races on three different tracks and been ranked in at least five of those races. Additionally, the pilot must been ranked among the top 50 for the man's events or top 40 for the women's events.

For the men's races the IBSF ranking will be used. The top two nations in the rankings earned three sleds each. The next seven nations earned two sleds each, while the next eight earned one sled each. The IBSF announced final quotas on January 24, 2022.

Summary

Results

References

Bobsleigh at the 2022 Winter Olympics
Men's events at the 2022 Winter Olympics